Michael John Witbrock is a computer scientist in the field of artificial intelligence. Witbrock is a native of New Zealand and is the former Vice President of Research at Cycorp, which is carrying out the Cyc project in an effort to produce a genuine Artificial Intelligence.

Background and Affiliations 

Dr. Witbrock was born in Christchurch, New Zealand, and has a Ph.D. in computer science from Carnegie Mellon University. Before joining Cycorp, he was a principal scientist at Terra Lycos, working on integrating statistical and knowledge-based approaches to understanding Web user behavior; he has also been associated with Just Systems Pittsburgh Research Center and the Informedia Digital Library at Carnegie Mellon.

Research Topics 

Dr. Witbrock's dissertation work was on speaker modeling; before going to Cycorp, he published in a broad range of areas, including:

 Neural networks
 Multimedia information retrieval
 Genetic design
 Computational linguistics
 Speech recognition
 Web-browser design

His work at Cycorp has focused on improving its knowledge formation efforts, particularly dialogue processing, and on improving accessibility to the Cyc project.

Selected publications 

 Witbrock, Michael, Baxter, David, Curtis, Jon, et al. "An Interactive Dialogue System for Knowledge Acquisition in Cyc," in Proceedings of the IJCAI-2003 Workshop on Mixed-Initiative Intelligent Systems, Acapulco, Aug 9, 2003.
 O’Hara, Tom, Witbrock, Michael, Aldag, Bjorn, Bertolo, Stefano, Salay, Nancy, Curtis, Jon, and Panton, Kathy. "Inducing Criteria of Lexicalization of Parts of Speech using the Cyc KB," in Proceedings of IJCAI-03, Acapulco August 12–15, 2003.
 Mittal, Vibhu O. and Witbrock, Michael J. "Language Modeling Experiments in Non-Extractive Summarization," Chapter 10 in Croft, W. Bruce and Lafferty, John, Language Modeling for Information Retrieval. Kluwer Academic Publishers, Dordrect, 2003.
 Banko, Michele, Mittal, Vibhu O., and Witbrock, Michael J., "Headline Generation Based on Statistical Translation," in ACL-2000, Proceedings of the 38th Annual Meeting of the Association for Computational Linguistics, Hong Kong, Oct 3-6, 2000.
 Witbrock, Michael J., and Mittal, Vibhu O., "Ultra-Summarization: A Statistical Approach to Generating Highly Condensed Non-Extractive Summaries," in SIGIR’99, Proceedings of the 22nd International Conference on Research and Development in Information Retrieval, Berkeley, CA, Aug 15-19, 1999.
 Hauptman, A., Witbrock, M., and Christel, M., "News-on-Demand: An Application of Informedia Technology," d-lib Magazine, The Magazine of the Digital Library Forum, September 1995.
 Fischer, Michael, Meyer, Michael, and Witbrock, Michael. "User Extensibility in Amiga Mosaic." Proceedings of the Second International World Wide Web Conference (WWW) '94: Mosaic and the Web, October, 1994.
 Witbrock, Michael and Zagha, Marco. "Back-Propagation Learning on the IBM GF11," Chapter in Przytula, K.W., and Prasanna Kumar, V.K. Parallel Digital Implementations of Neural Networks PTR Prentice Hall. Englewood Cliffs. 1993.
 Witbrock, Michael and Haffner, Patrick. "Rapid Connectionist Speaker Adaptation," Proceedings of the IEEE 1992 International Conference on Acoustics, Speech, and Signal Processing, March, 1992.

Random Art 

Together with John Mount, Witbrock is credited with genetic art, a kind of Computer-generated art.

References

Sources
 Michael Witbrock's Cycorp home page
 Cycorp publications - recent publications and downloadable versions in PDF and/or PostScript format
 Michael Witbrock's CMU publications page
 Michael Witbrock's video bibliography

External links 

 The current state of the genetic art project
 A public version of Cyc available to researchers
 Video Bibliography

Artificial intelligence researchers
Carnegie Mellon University alumni
Living people
1962 births
People from Christchurch
Lisp (programming language) people
American computer businesspeople